Maria Zuba (born 6 April 1951 in Suchedniów) is a Polish politician. She was elected to Sejm on 25 September 2005, getting 3397 votes in 33 Kielce district as a candidate from the Law and Justice list.

See also
Members of Polish Sejm 2005-2007

External links
Maria Zuba - parliamentary page - includes declarations of interest, voting record, and transcripts of speeches.

1951 births
Living people
People from Skarżysko County
Members of the Polish Sejm 2005–2007
Women members of the Sejm of the Republic of Poland
Law and Justice politicians
21st-century Polish women politicians
Members of the Polish Sejm 2007–2011
Members of the Polish Sejm 2011–2015